The Tongatapu rail (Gallirallus hypoleucus) was a species of bird in the family Rallidae. It was apparently native to the island of Tongatapu in the Kingdom of Tonga, in Polynesia in the south-west Pacific Ocean.  It is known only from brief descriptions of a specimen, now lost, collected from Tongatapu in 1777 in the course of James Cook's third voyage to the Pacific, and from a contemporary illustration by Georg Forster.

References

Tongatapu rail
†
Extinct birds of Oceania
Tongatapu rail
Bird extinctions since 1500